Manahan Sitompul is an Indonesian judge and currently one of the justices of the Constitutional Court of Indonesia.

In January 2017, Sitompul was investigated alongside several other justices on the Constitutional Court in relation to a graft scandal. Chief Justice Arief Hidayat cleared Sitompul and colleague I Dewa Gede Palguna of any wrongdoing, but found evidence of bribery in an animal health case that led to the dismissal of their (former) colleague Patrialis Akbar.

References

Justices of the Constitutional Court of Indonesia
21st-century Indonesian judges
Living people
People of Batak descent
Year of birth missing (living people)